Luboš Kozel (born 16 March 1971) is a Czech football manager and former player. Following a playing career where he was associated with Slavia Prague, he spent seven years as manager of FK Dukla Prague, overseeing their transition from the Second League to the Czech First League. Kozel played for the Czech Republic, appearing in nine matches and scoring one goal.

Playing career
Kozel played the majority of his club football at Slavia Prague, playing nine seasons of the Czech First League there. He went on to play for Bohemians Prague and Viktoria Plzeň in the top flight, amassing a total of 160 appearances in the league.

He represented his country at the 1997 FIFA Confederations Cup. In his country he played for SK Slavia Prague and he also played for Hungarian Újpest FC.

Managerial career
In 2004, Kozel started work as assistant coach at the "B" team of Slavia Prague. He later took charge of Slavia "B" as the head coach.

Kozel signed a two year contract with FK Jablonec 97 in June 2007. This was his first Czech First League management position. After having won just one match in the opening nine games of the season, coupled with his side's exit from the 2007–08 UEFA Cup in the second qualifying round, Kozel become the fourth manager to lose his job in the 2007–08 Czech First League. Just a week later, however, he was appointed as assistant to Ladislav Škorpil at Liberec.

Kozel was appointed manager of FK Dukla Prague in December 2009, taking over from Günter Bittengel. In the 2010–11 Czech 2. Liga, Kozel led Dukla to the title and subsequent promotion to the Czech First League. After leading Dukla to consecutive sixth-placed league finishes in 2011–12 and 2012–13, Kozel's contract was extended for a further three years. In 2016 Kozel left Dukla following the expiry of his contract. His replacement was named as Jaroslav Šilhavý. In 2016, he became the coach of the Czech national under-19 team.

Honours

Player
 Slavia Prague
 Czech First League: 1995–96

Managerial
 Dukla Prague
 Czech National Football League: 2010–11

References

External links
 
 Profile at iDNES.cz 

1971 births
People from Vlašim
Living people
Czech footballers
Czech Republic international footballers
Czech First League players
SK Slavia Prague players
Bohemians 1905 players
FC Viktoria Plzeň players
Újpest FC players
1997 FIFA Confederations Cup players
Czech football managers
Czech First League managers
FK Jablonec managers
FC Baník Ostrava managers
Expatriate footballers in Hungary
Association football defenders
FC Slovan Liberec managers
Sportspeople from the Central Bohemian Region
FK Dukla Prague managers